Geradts is a surname. Notable people with the surname include:

 Evert Geradts (born 1943), Dutch cartoonist and former underground comics artist
 Jacob Gestman Geradts (born 1951), Dutch pin up artist

Dutch-language surnames